Ahmed Saad Al-Azhari, is an Egyptian born, British Islamic scholar, and is the founder of the Ihsan Institute. He is an advocate of teaching traditional Islamic sciences; which he has taught in various parts of the world.

Early life
Saad was born in the northern Egyptian Governorate of Monufiya. His father was a scholar who graduated from Al-Azhar University, Egypt – faculty of Arabic Language. Their family are descendants from the Prophet Mohammad through the grandson Hasan ibn Ali.

Education
Saad completed the memorisation of the Qur’an at the age of ten, and studied basic Arabic and Islamic sciences at the hands of his father. He delivered his first Friday sermon at the age of 15, and led his first prayer at the age of 13. He memorized Al-Alfiyya of Ibn Malik at the age of 13 and Riyad As-Salihin of Al-Nawawi at the age of 15. He committed thousands of lines of poetry and prose to memory. He has memorized texts on logic, tajwid, aqidah, Arabic, rhetoric , and studied Maliki fiqh under Shaykh Abdul-Hamid Āl Al-Shaykh Mubarak of Ahsa and many other sciences. He also holds one of the highest chains of the Qur'an among his peers with 29 people between him and the prophet Muhammad.

In 1988, he enrolled into Al-Azhar system of schools where he graduated with a B.A. (Hons) in Islamic Studies in English, from the Al-Azhar University. Throughout his career, Saad has studied Islamic sciences with scholars such as: former Grand Mufti of Egypt, Ali Gomaa,  and Habib Umar bin Hafiz.

Career
In 2005, Saad travelled to teach Islamic Sciences in the US, Germany and Canada. He received an invitation from the University of California, Santa Barbara to participate in a programme on understanding religious pluralism, funded by the U.S. Department of State's Bureau of Educational and Cultural Affairs.

In 2007, Saad settled in the UK after being appointed the Imam of the North London Central Mosque. The mosque was previously known as the Finsbury Park mosque, which gained notoriety when the extremist preacher Abu Hamza al Masri was the Imam of the mosque. During Saad's time as Imam, he served on the panel of various interfaith forums, and delivered community projects tackling extremism. Since Saad's appointment, it was reported that his efforts have brought greater diversity to the mosques worshipers, and played an important part in successfully integrating local Muslims into London life. Saad's efforts at the Finsbury Park Mosque were recognised by the current Labour Party leader Jeremy Corbyn and MP Catherine West.

Saad was appointed as a Senior Imam at Palmers Green Mosque in London in 2012 where he taught traditional Islamic sciences and served as the principle khatib of the Friday sermon.

Saad currently is the founder and Director of the Ihsan Institute. "

Ihsan Institute

In addition to various appointments as resident Imam and Scholar at a number of institutions, Saad founded the Ihsan Institute in 2013. The institute’s aim is "to create a balanced, motivating, engaging and genuine understanding of Islam in both Muslim and non-Muslim communities, and to provide real scholarship that realises the quality and the reality." The flagship course the Ihsan Institute offers is known as the ‘Al-Husna Certificate in Traditional Islamic Studies’. This course is delivered by Saad.

Views

Saad has been known for his interfaith work, promotion of tolerance, and peaceful co-existence. He is featured as part of the Alliance of the Middle Way – a UK based not-for-profit organisation that rejects extremism and promotes return to tradition and its diversity. Other individuals from the Islamic scholarly community who are also featured are Timothy Winter and Abdallah Bin Bayyah.

In April 2012, Saad appeared on Doha Debates forum which is aired on the BBC World Service. The debate was entitled "This House believes Arab governments need to take urgent measures to protect religious minorities", where Saad argued for the motion, and expressed the need for stable democratic, pluralistic Arab governments. Saad also mentioned that extreme interpretations of Islam have resulted from a disregard for the authority in the main, qualified Islamic institutions e.g. Al-Azhar University.

Publications
Books authored
 Lamlamaat min nafahaat ahl Al-Iraadaat: a poetry anthology (2015).
 Contemplating the Quran:  A Thematic thirty part Commentary on the Noble Quran (2017).
 Forty Parables of the Quran (forthcoming).
 Surat Al-Hujurāt: From Particulars to Universals (forthcoming).
 Muwāsalāt min Suhi Ahlil Irādāt: A Poetry Anthology (forthcoming).
 Fifty Inspiring Biographies of Fifty Scholars Who Died Before Fifty Years of Age (forthcoming).
 A Hundred Scholars from Menoufiyyah (forthcoming).

Translations
 Habib Abu Bakr al-Mashhur, An-Nubdha As-Sughra (2016).

References

1978 births
English people of Egyptian descent
Egyptian emigrants to England
Living people
Islamic scholars in the United Kingdom